The Bat, formerly called Flight Deck and Top Gun, is a suspended roller coaster at Kings Island in Mason, Ohio. Built by Arrow Dynamics, the ride was known as Top Gun when it opened in 1993. It is the park's second suspended coaster following an earlier prototype from Arrow Development — also called The Bat – that operated at Kings Island from 1981 to 1983. The layout is designed to give riders the illusion they are narrowly missing track supports and other elements while swinging through sharp turns.

History
The  structure was planned years in advance before Paramount Communications purchased the park in 1992. However, Paramount took over operations in time to determine the ride's theme which was based on the Paramount Pictures film Top Gun.  On November 11, 1992, Kings Island announced that a new roller coaster named Top Gun would be added to the park. The ride would be an Arrow Dynamics suspended coaster, very similar to The Bat which had operated at the park in the 1980s. Construction of Top Gun began in December 1992 and was completed in early spring 1993. The park hired John DeCuir Jr., a production designer who worked on the film, to design the ride's loading platform, so that it would resemble the deck of an aircraft carrier. Top Gun opened on April 9, 1993.

Top Gun was renamed Flight Deck in 2008, two years after Cedar Fair purchased the park. The theme music and signage were changed to remove all references to the film. Cedar Fair had rights to continue using the Top Gun movie theme through 2016 but made the decision to remove all Paramount themes from the park much sooner. On October 29, 2013, the 33rd anniversary of the announcement of the original Bat, the park announced that Flight Deck would be renamed The Bat for the 2014 season. The ride was repainted with a new color scheme of orange track with charcoal supports, and black trains.

Ride experience

Queue 
The Bat's official logo is displayed at the entrance to the ride queue, and the queue of the defunct Son of Beast can be seen to the left. The pathway has many turns and curves, and guests will eventually reach an underpass that features a painted American Flag. A staircase at the end leads into the station.

When the ride opened as Top Gun, guests walked through an exhibit depicting an aircraft carrier control room prior to reaching the staircase. Access to the control room exhibit was blocked off from the queue several years later, some time before Cedar Fair purchased the park in 2006. Music from the motion picture, which originally played throughout the queue, was also removed during the theme transition to Flight Deck.

Layout 
The ride begins with an ascent up a  chain lift. At the top, the train dips slightly and turns roughly 225 degrees to the right. The train then drops  into a valley banking right at the bottom as it begins to climb into the horseshoe element. The cars swing up and around to the left exiting the horseshoe parallel to same position during entry. Dropping back into the same valley, the train makes another banked turn to the right followed by a slight turn to the left as it passes by the observation area located near the exit.

The last part of the ride takes riders through a final series of sharp turns, each sending the train swinging quickly from one side to the other. At the ride's farthest point from the initial drop, the track makes its sharpest turn sending the train back toward the loading station. Afterward, the train navigates two more inclining turns before stopping abruptly at the brake run. The sudden brake right out of the last turn causes the cars to swing briefly even after the train has stopped moving forward.

The Bat has a similar layout to the Vortex at Canada's Wonderland, which was built two years earlier. The Vortex, however, has one less car on each train and excels in height, speed, and track length.

Incident
On June 22, 2022, one of the wheels on a moving train carrying passengers came loose. No passengers were injured, and they were able to safely exit the ride. The Bat was closed for repairs following the incident, and it reopened several weeks later.

References

External links

 The Bat at Kings Island

Roller coasters operated by Cedar Fair
Roller coasters in Ohio